A29 or A-29 may refer to:

Aircraft
 A-29 Hudson, a Lockheed World War II aircraft
 Aero A.29, a Czech target tug floatplane of the 1920s
 Focke-Wulf A 29, a variant of the 1927 German Focke-Wulf A 17 airliner with a BMW VI engine
 A-29, another name of the Embraer EMB 314 Super Tucano

Roads
 A29 road (England), a road connecting Capel and Bognor Regis
 A29 autoroute, a road in France connecting Le Havre with the A26 autoroute at Saint-Quentin
 A 29 motorway (Germany), a road connecting Wilhelmshaven and Oldenburg
 Autostrada A29 (Italy), a road connecting Palermo and Mazara del Vallo
 A29 motorway (Netherlands), a road connecting Rotterdam and Steenbergen
 A29 road (Northern Ireland), a road connecting Portrush and Coleraine
 A29 road (Sri Lanka), a road connecting Vavuniya and Horowpathana

Other uses
 HLA-A29, a human serotype